Chris Adams (born 12 August 1986) is an Australian professional rugby league footballer. He previously played for the Newcastle Knights in the National Rugby League.

Background
Born in Nambour, Queensland, Adams played his junior football for the Bellingen Magpies, before moving down to the Central Coast, New South Wales in 2005 to play for the Wyong Roos in the Newcastle Rugby League.

Playing career

Early career
In 2006, Adams played for the North Sydney Bears' Jersey Flegg Cup team, before returning to the Wyong Roos in 2007. In 2009, he joined the Cessnock Goannas. In 2010, he was signed by the Central Coast Centurions in the New South Wales Cup, before being elevated to the Newcastle Knights' NRL squad soon after.

2012
In Round 10 of the 2012 NRL season, Adams made his NRL debut for the Knights against the North Queensland Cowboys. He went on to play two more games that season.

2013
At the conclusion of the 2013 season, Adams was released by the Knights and rejoined the Cessnock Goannas in the Newcastle Rugby League.

2014
In June, Adams captained the Newcastle Rebels in the Country Rugby League championships.

2015
In 2015, Adams joined Lakes United, winning the Newcastle Rugby League premiership with them.

2016
On 29 June, Adams rejoined the Newcastle Knights mid-season on a contract until the end of 2016. He made his return in Round 19 against the Melbourne Storm, his first NRL game in four years. As part of the deal, Lakes United requested that he would be released in time for their finals campaign in the Newcastle Rugby League. After 5 matches with the Knights, he was released back to Lakes United.

References

External links
Newcastle Knights profile

1986 births
Living people
Australian rugby league players
Central Coast Centurions players
Cessnock Goannas players
Lakes United Seagulls players
Newcastle Knights players
Rugby league hookers
Rugby league players from Nambour, Queensland
Wyong Roos players